The 3′ UTR of mRNA hilD,  a master regulator of Salmonella pathogenicity island 1 (SPI-1), is a prokaryotic example of functional 3'UTR.  The 3'UTR is a target for hilD mRNA degradation by the degradosome and it may play a role in hilD and SPI-1 expression by serving as a target  for the  Hfq RNA chaperone. Under non-invasive conditions it is necessary to keep low levels of SPI-1 expression. It plays a role in  S. Typhimurium virulence as a regulatory motif.

References 

RNA
Non-coding RNA